Igualita a mí may refer to:

 Igualita a mí (2010 film), an Argentine comedy film
 Igualita a mí (2022 film), a Peruvian comedy film, a remake of the above